Beau Ideal is a 1931 American film.

Beau Ideal may also refer to:
 Beau Ideal (novel), a 1927 novel by P. C. Wren